Arbellara (in Corsican Arbiddali, pronounced [ar.bi.ˈɖːaː.li]) is a commune in the Corse-du-Sud department of France on the island of Corsica. It is part of the micro-region of Viggiano in the north of the Rocca region.

The inhabitants of the commune are known as Arbellarais or Arbellaraises in French.

Geography

Arbellara is located some 6 km east of Propriano and 2 km south of Fozzano. Access to the commune is by road D19 from Viggianello in the west which passes through the village then continues north to Fozzano. The D119 road goes south from the village then turns south-west to join the D69 which goes north-east then north to Loreto-di-Tallano. Apart from the village there is also the hamlet of Acoravo in the south-east of the commune at the intersection of the D119 and D69. The commune is mostly mountainous and forested.

The southern border of the commune is formed by the Rizzanese river which flows west to the Mediterranean Sea south of Propriano.

History
In 1583 the commune was pillaged and the inhabitants massacred by the Turks.
After reprisals by the villagers, it was again pillaged by the  Turks in 1584.

Administration

List of Successive Mayors

Demography
In 2017 the commune had 156 inhabitants.

Culture and heritage

Civil heritage
The commune has many buildings and structures that are registered as historical monuments:
Houses (16th-19th century)
The Spin'a Cavallu Genoese Bridge (16th century), a hump-backed bridge on the Rizzanèse river.
It has been used as a special stage in the Tour de Corse.

Religious heritage
The Parish Church of Saint Sebastian (18th century) is registered as an historical monument. The Church contains many items that are registered as historical objects:

An Exhibition (19th century)
A Sunburst Monstrance (19th century)
A Chalice with Paten (19th century)
Stations of the Cross (19th century)
The Furniture in the Church (19th century)
A Sunburst Monstrance (19th century)
A Chalice with Paten (1) (19th century)
A Chalice with Paten (2) (19th century)
A Statue: Christ on the Cross (19th century)
A Statue: Salvator Mundi (19th century)
A Statue: Saint Roch (19th century)
A Statue: Saint Sebastian (19th century)
A Statue: Virgin and child (19th century)
A Statue: Saint Gavin (19th century)

Environmental heritage
The Marteau et l'Enclume (Hammer and Anvil), rocks dominating the heights of the commune.

Culinary Specialities
Present day: sheep cheese, lamb milk.
In the past: olive oil (oil press), vineyards (wine presses in homes).
Blessing of the houses on Holy Saturday: the priest is offered eggs, ham, and sheep cheeses.

See also
Communes of the Corse-du-Sud department

References

External links
Arbellara on Géoportail, National Geographic Institute (IGN) website 

Communes of Corse-du-Sud